Johan (Juho) Rikkonen (11 December 1874, in Jääski – May 1918, in Viipuri) was a Finnish bricklayer and politician. He was a member of the Parliament of Finland from 1916 to 1918, representing the Social Democratic Party of Finland (SDP). In 1918, during the Finnish Civil War, he sided with the Reds. He was made prisoner by White troops and shot in Viipuri in May 1918.

References

1874 births
1918 deaths
People from Vyborg District
People from Viipuri Province (Grand Duchy of Finland)
Social Democratic Party of Finland politicians
Members of the Parliament of Finland (1916–17)
Members of the Parliament of Finland (1917–19)
People of the Finnish Civil War (Red side)
People executed by Finland by firing squad